Stjernberg is a Swedish surname. Notable people with the surname include:

Peter Stjernberg (born 1970), Swedish wrestler
Robin Stjernberg (born 1991), Swedish pop singer, songwriter, and producer

Swedish-language surnames